Gentilly Woods is a neighborhood of the city of New Orleans.  A subdistrict of the Gentilly District Area, its boundaries as defined by the City Planning Commission are: Dreux Avenue to the north, Industrial Canal to the east, Gentilly Boulevard to the south and People's Avenue to the west.

Geography

Adjacent Neighborhoods
 Pontchartrain Park (north)
 Pines Village (east)
 Desire Area (south)
 Gentilly Terrace (west)

Boundaries
The City Planning Commission defines the boundaries of Gentilly Woods as these streets: Dreux Avenue, Industrial Canal, Gentilly Boulevard and People's Avenue.

Demographics
As of the census of 2000, there were 4,387 people, 1,487 households, and 1,147 families residing in the neighborhood.  The population density was 6,267 /mi2 (2,437 /km2).

As of the census of 2010, there were 2,817 people, 999 households, and 715 families residing in the neighborhood.

History
The Gentilly Woods subdivision was developed in the early 1950s, in an area adjacent to the Higgins Shipyards, which was located on the Industrial Canal.

During World War II, the Higgins plant occupied most of the land. At the factory there were homes constructed of plywood that employees were reported to have occupied during the war effort, they were aptly named Higgins Huts.

With the growth of the city after the war and the need for new housing, Gentilly Woods was developed. A corporation founded by W.H. Crawford and Associates began work, in early 1951, with a plan to construct more than 1400 homes designed to meet the booming post-war housing market.

The City of New Orleans made arrangements for public transportation and the developers signed contracts for city sewerage, drainage, water mains, and other site improvements before a single house was begun.

See also
 Neighborhoods in New Orleans
 Gentilly, New Orleans

References

Neighborhoods in New Orleans